The 35th Hundred Flowers Awards was held on September 26, 2022 in Zhengzhou, Henan, China. My People, My Country received the Best Picture Award, while Frant Gwo, director of the science fiction film The Wandering Earth was crowned with the Best Director title. Huang Xiaoming won Best Actor for his performance in The Bravest, and Zhou Dongyu won Best Actress for her role in Better Days.

Winners and nominees

References 

2020
2020 film awards